Awantika College was established in 2000 and is in the historic city of Ujjain, Madhya Pradesh.

Academic Programmes

College offers following undergraduate programmes:

Bachelor of Commerce (B.Com)
Bachelor of Business Administration (BBA)
B.SC. in Biotechnology Chimistry and Zoology 
B.SC. in Microbiology Chimistry and Zoology 
B.SC. in Botany Chimistry and Zoology 
B.SC. in Physios
B.SC. in Maths
BCA
BA
BA in Computer

References

Alumni : Abhishek M Garg

External links 
 

Vikram University
Educational institutions established in 2000
Education in Ujjain
2000 establishments in Madhya Pradesh
Buildings and structures in Ujjain
Commerce colleges in India